Alfredo Fernando Razón "Freddy" Gonzalez (born 1 October 1978 in Parañaque) is a Filipino former football player. He was a member of the Philippines national football team.

Early years
Gonzalez's mother, Terry Razón, enrolled him to Tomas Lozano's Makati Football School (MFS) at age six. He later became the high school football star of Colegio de San Agustin. Gonzalez earned himself a soccer scholarship to the University of Portland, then considered one of the most professionally run (football wise) and well coached university teams in the US. He stayed there for two years (1998/99) and honed his offensive skills playing for the Portland Pilots, the school soccer team.

Club career
Learning the game from Spanish expatriate, Tomas Lozano, Gonzalez tried out with French club Calais RUFC coached by Ladislas Lozano, Tomas' brother, in 2000. Gonzalez trained in France for two weeks but was sidelined due to a torn hamstring. By the time he was recovered from injury, Lozano had already accepted a coaching job in Morocco.

Due to impressing team manager Nguyen Tien Huy of the V-League club Ngân hàng Đông Á (East Asian Commercial Bank FC) for his play for the Philippines in the 2002 Tiger Cup in Jakarta, Gonzalez signed a one-year contract with the club in January 2003.

He also played for Komodo AS of Indonesia in 2004, being the only active Filipino professional player at that time. He was a part-time player in Europe and also played for Kaya in the Philippines. Unfortunately, right after his contract with the Vietnam professional club expired Gonzalez retired from playing football, concentrating more into his interest in surfing and other business ventures such as bringing in the Brazilian flip flops brand Havaianas into the Philippines.

Return to football
However, he put up the team Pachanga FC for the United Football League Division 2 in 2011.

In January 2012, for the first time in almost half a decade of retirement, he played for Pachanga. He scored in his debut in the 4-0 win against Agila in the opening match.

In the mid of June 2012, he led the team to the championship in Division 2 having 123 goals in the league. He won the Division 2's Golden Ball and Golden Boot Awards together with teammate Kenneth Dolloso, which won the Best Goalkeeper Award.

Loyola
On January 7, 2013, Gonzales transferred to Loyola before the start of 2013 PFF–Smart National Championship knockout stage and UFL 4th season.

International career
Gonzalez made his debut for the Philippine national team in the 1997 South East Asian Games. He then played in the then "ASEAN Tiger Cup," (now Suzuki Cup), in Vietnam in 1998. He has, since then, represented the country in South East Asian Games (particularly the 1999 SEA Games in Brunei), in the Tiger Cup, and in any other invitational and qualifying tournaments.

International goals
Scores and results list the Philippines' goal tally first.

Personal life
Gonzalez graduated with an Engineering degree. He is married to Regina Anne Marie Arcenas-Gonzalez, Managing Director of Terry S.A., Inc. (Official distributor of Havaianas, David & Goliath, Pininho, and Dupe in the Philippines). With his varied interests, he opened "Aloha Board Sports," a shop that catered to skaters and surfers. He also owned a skate shop at the Global City in Taguig called 5-O.

Honours

Club
Pachanga
UFL Division 2: 2012

Loyola
UFL Cup: 2013
PFF National Men's Club Championship: 2014–15

Individual
UFL Division 2 Golden Ball: 2012
UFL Division 2 Golden Boot: 2012

References
General

Specific

External links 

1978 births
Living people
Filipino footballers
Filipino expatriate footballers
Philippines international footballers
Filipino people of Spanish descent
Expatriate footballers in Indonesia
Expatriate footballers in Vietnam
Portland Pilots men's soccer players
F.C. Meralco Manila players
Kaya F.C. players
People from Mandaluyong
Footballers from Metro Manila
Association football forwards
Competitors at the 1997 Southeast Asian Games
Competitors at the 1999 Southeast Asian Games
Southeast Asian Games competitors for the Philippines